Chatrood or Chatrud or Chatroud (also Romanized as Chatrūd) is a city and capital of Chatrud District, in Kerman County, Kerman Province, Iran.  At the 2006 census, its population was 5,660, in 1,378 families.

References

Populated places in Kerman County
Cities in Kerman Province